The unicorn grenadier, Coelorinchus productus, is a species of rattail.

It can be distinguished from its congeners by its fairly long, pointed snout, teeth restricted to the central premaxilla and by only having a small ventral bioluminescent organ.

References

A new species, Caelorinchus sheni, and 19 new records of grenadiers (Pisces: Gadiformes: Macrouridae) from Taiwan - CHIOU Mei-Luen ; SHAO Kwang-Tsao ; IWAMOTO Tomio

Macrouridae
Fish described in 1916